Qaleh Now-e Shamlu (also Romanized as Qal‘eh Now-e Shāmlū) is a village in Bakharz Rural District, in the Central District of Bakharz County, Razavi Khorasan Province, Iran. At the 2006 census, its population was 646, in 131 families.

References 

Populated places in Bakharz County